Mary Poppins: Original Cast Soundtrack is the soundtrack album of the 1964 film Mary Poppins, with music and lyrics written by songwriters Richard M. Sherman and Robert B. Sherman, and adapted and conducted by Irwin Kostal.

The original 1964 album release features seventeen tracks, consisting of sixteen songs and one overture track of film score. The soundtrack album was released by Disneyland Records the same year as the film on LP and reel-to-reel tape. Due to time constraints, some songs were edited (such as "Step in Time", "Jolly Holiday", and "A Spoonful of Sugar"), while songs also featured introductory passages ("Supercalifragilisticexpialidocious") or completed endings ("Sister Suffragette", "Fidelity Fiduciary Bank", "A Man Has Dreams"). The film's music received critical acclaim, winning two Academy Awards for Best Original Score and Best Original Song (for "Chim Chim Cher-ee") and two Grammy Awards for Best Original Score Written for a Motion Picture and Best Recording for Children.

Walt Disney Records reissued the soundtrack in 1997, including a 16-minute track of unreleased songs and demo versions. In 2004, as part of the film's 40th anniversary (also called Special Edition), a 28-track disc (as part of a two-disc set) was released. In 2014 (the 50th anniversary of the film's release), the soundtrack was released in a 3-CD edition as part of the Walt Disney Records The Legacy Collection series; this edition includes the complete soundtrack in its entirety, as well as demos of many "lost" tracks.

Track listing

Background
The Shermans wrote additional songs that were unused, readapted into existing ones, or cut from the final film. The majority of this music was subsequently released in later editions of the soundtrack album.

Deleted songs 
A number of other songs were written for the film by the Sherman Brothers and either rejected or cut for time. Richard Sherman, on the 2004 DVD release, indicated that more than 30 songs were written at various stages of the film's development. No cast recordings of any of these songs have been released to the public, only demos or later performances done by the songwriters — with the exception of the rooftop reprise of "Chim Chim Cher-ee" and the "smoke staircase yodel" mentioned below.
 "The Chimpanzoo", was originally to follow "I Love to Laugh" during the Uncle Albert "ceiling tea party" sequence, but it was dropped from the soundtrack just before Julie Andrews and company were to record it. The fast-paced number was not unveiled to the public until Richard Sherman, aided by recently uncovered storyboards, performed it on the 2004 DVD edition. The re-creation suggests it was to have been another sequence combining animation and live action.
 "Practically Perfect" was intended to introduce Mary but instead the melody of the piece was used for "Sister Suffragette" (used to introduce Mrs. Banks). A different song with the same name was written for the stage musical.
 "The Eyes of Love", a romantic ballad intended for Bert and Mary, but according to Richard Sherman, Andrews suggested privately to Disney that this song was unsuitable. In response, "A Spoonful of Sugar" was written.
 "Mary Poppins Melody" was to be performed when Mary introduces herself to the children. Elements of the song later became part of "Stay Awake". The melody was the basis for a couple of other songs that were ultimately cut from the film.
 "A Name's a Name". Heard on a recording taken of a meeting between the Sherman Brothers and Travers, this song was originally intended for the nursery scene that later became "A Spoonful of Sugar". The melody was reused for "Mary Poppins Melody".
 "You Think, You Blink" was a short piece that Bert was to sing just before entering the chalk painting (and starting the "Jolly Holiday" sequence). In the film, Dick Van Dyke simply recites the lyric instead of singing it.
 "West Wind" was a short ballad to be sung by Mary. The song was later retitled "Mon Amour Perdu" and used in the later Disney film, Big Red.
 "The Right Side" was to be sung by Mary to Michael after he gets out of bed cranky. It was recycled for the Disney Channel television series Welcome to Pooh Corner as Winnie the Pooh's personal theme song.
 "Measure Up" was to accompany the scene in which Mary takes the tape measure to Jane and Michael.
 "Admiral Boom" was to be the theme song for the cannon-firing neighbor of the Banks Residence, but it was cut by Walt Disney as being unnecessary. The melody of the song remains in the film, and the bombastic theme is heard whenever Boom appears onscreen. One line from this song ("The whole world takes its time from Greenwich, but Greenwich, they say, takes its time from Admiral Boom!") is spoken by Bert early in the film.
 "Sticks, Paper and Strings" was an early version of "Let's Go Fly a Kite."
 "Lead the Righteous Life", an intentionally poorly written hymn, was to have been sung by Katie Nanna (Elsa Lanchester) along with Jane and Michael prior to Mary Poppins' arrival. The melody was later reused for a similar song in The Happiest Millionaire
 "The Pearly Song" was not deleted per se but was instead incorporated into "Supercalifragilisticexpialidocious".

The Compass Sequence, a precursor to "Jolly Holiday", was to be a multiple-song sequence. A number of possible musical components have been identified:
 "South Sea Island Symphony"
 "Chinese Festival Song"
 "Tim-Buc-Too" – elements of this were reused for "The Chimpanzoo" which was also cut
 "Tiki Town" – the melody was reused for "The Chimpanzoo"
 "North Pole Polka"
 "Land of Sand" – later rewritten as "Trust in Me" for the animated version of The Jungle Book
 "The Beautiful Briny" – later used in Bedknobs and Broomsticks
 "East is East" – another variation on the unused "Mary Poppins Melody".

Deleted scores and music 
 The "Step in Time" sequence ends with the chimney sweeps being scattered by an onslaught of fireworks fired from Admiral Boom's house. In the final film, the scene plays out with sound effects and no music. The DVD release included the original version of the scene which was accompanied by a complex instrumental musical arrangement that combined "Step in Time", the "Admiral Boom" melody (see above), and "A Spoonful of Sugar". This musical arrangement can be heard on the film's original soundtrack.
 Andrews recorded a brief reprise of "Chim Chim Cher-ee" which was to have accompanied Mary, Bert, and the children as they marched across the rooftops of London (an instrumental reprise of "A Spoonful of Sugar" was used as a march instead; however, Andrews and Dick Van Dyke can still be seen and heard singing a reprise of "Chim Chim Cher-ee" in that sequence, just before the other chimney sweeps appear for the "Step in Time" number).
 The robin Mary Poppins whistles with in "A Spoonful of Sugar" originally sang a lyric as well.
 Andrews also recorded a brief yodel which breaks into the first line of "A Spoonful of Sugar" which was to have been used to "activate" the smoke staircase prior to the "Step in Time" number. Although cut from the film, footage of Andrews performing this exists and was included on the 2004 DVD. The DVD also indicates that an alternate version of the yodel performed by Dick Van Dyke may also exist.

Certifications and sales

References

External links

1964 soundtrack albums
Mary Poppins
Buena Vista Records soundtracks
Disney film soundtracks
Walt Disney Records soundtracks
Grammy Award for Best Compilation Soundtrack for Visual Media
Grammy Award for Best Musical Album for Children
Fantasy film soundtracks
Musical film soundtracks
Scores that won the Best Original Score Academy Award